The dusky-legged guan (Penelope obscura) is a species of bird in the family Cracidae, the chachalacas, guans, and curassows. It is found in Uruguay, northeastern Argentina and southernmost areas of Paraguay and Brazil. In early 2021, the former subspecies P. o. bridgesi, found in southwestern Bolivia and northwestern Argentina, was elevated to species rank as Yungas guan.

Habitat 

Its natural habitats are subtropical or tropical moist lowland forest.

Description 

The bird measures an average of 73 centimeters in length and weighs an average of 1.2 kilograms, being very similar in appearance to its smaller relative, the rusty-margined guan (P. supercilliaris).

Diet 

It eats fruit, flowers and buds taken from the ground or plucked from tree branches, and acts as a seed disperser for various species of trees and palms, such as the endangered palm Euterpe edulis, or the palms of the genus Syagrus (e.g. queen palm and licuri).

References

External links

Dusky-legged Guan videos on the Internet Bird Collection
Stamps (for Argentina) with RangeMap
Dusky-legged Guan photo gallery VIREO
Photo-High Res; Article chandra.as.utexas.edu—"Birds of Brazil"

dusky-legged guan
Birds of the Atlantic Forest
Birds of the South Region
Birds of Uruguay
Birds of Argentina
Birds of the Selva Misionera
Birds of the Southern Andean Yungas
dusky-legged guan
Taxonomy articles created by Polbot